WSJU-TV, virtual and UHF digital channel 31, was a television station licensed to San Juan, Puerto Rico. The station was owned by Aerco Broadcasting Corporation. WSJU-TV's studios were located at the IBC-AERCO building at 1554 Bori Street, Urb. Antonsanti in Rio Piedras. Its transmitter was located at Cerro la Marquesa in Aguas Buenas.

During most of the 2000s, the station's programming consisted mostly of music videos until it became an affiliate of Spanish Broadcasting System's Mega TV on August 25, 2008. It was carried by Dish Network and Liberty Puerto Rico.

History
On May 29, 1966, WITA-TV signed on for the first time, as the first English-language television station on the island broadcasting in color. It was owned by the Puerto Rican newspaper El Imparcial, but, in 1967, it surrendered the WITA-TV license to the Federal Communications Commission (FCC), which canceled it in 1968.

Before the year 2000, the station's callsign was WRWR-TV. When the station started, it was branded as Cinema 30 TV and broadcast older movies. Then, in 1986, it became an affiliate of Univision. The station went off the air around 1991. It then reappeared around 1999 through 2000. It applied to assign its station license from Three Star Telecast to International Broadcasting Corp.

Prior to and including the early 1990s, the call letters WSJU (now WTCV) were used by an NBC affiliated station broadcasting on UHF channel 18 (Liberty channel 12) with studios in Carolina, Puerto Rico. Most of the programming was in English, making it one of at least two stations at the time to broadcast in English (the other was WPRV-TV, "The Bright Spot"). In addition to carrying local television programming like The Judy Gordon Show and Chicola y la Ganga, WSJU carried a variety of NBC programs such as Wheel of Fortune, The Tonight Show Starring Johnny Carson (and later Jay Leno), and Late Night with David Letterman during his run at NBC.

As with many stations serving the metropolitan area of San Juan and vicinity, the transmitter tower was located on top of the peak of El Yunque. Broadcasting hours ran from 6:00 a.m. to midnight daily. At the end of each broadcast day, the station played video rolls of the Puerto Rican and United States national anthems.

Today, the Carolina studios for the former WSJU are owned and operated by the local affiliate of the Catholic Radio and Television Network, TeleOro channel 13 (WORO-DT; formerly WPRV-TV).

WSJU has continuously been branded as "Tele San Juan" from its time on channel 18 to its current seat on channel 30.

In August 2008, SBS entered into an agreement with WSJU, which had formerly aired music videos, making it an affiliate of Mega TV. Mega TV Puerto Rico, as WSJU was branded from then on, carried a full prime time schedule as well as a Puerto Rico-focused newscast, Meganoticias.

WSJU aired infomercials 15 hours a day (midnight to 3:00 pm).

In August 2009, the station opened a digital subchannel dedicated to music videos. This subchannel made its formal debut in September 2009 as PlayTV. Like competing music video channels TCV and VideoMax, PlayTV allowed viewers to send text messages to friends, which were displayed on air. PlayTV differentiated itself though, in that they assigned numeric codes to each music video, and viewers could send a text message to the station using those codes to request a particular video.

In October 2009, WSJU opened a third subchannel airing programming from the Dominican Republic.

WSJU-TV became the dominant television station for young adults by airing music videos in partnership with major record companies. In 2010, WSJU-TV introduced new television stations that proved to have significant value to TV viewers.

WSJU-TV also developed new media platforms (known as AiLive Network) to complement its electronic media offering, adding iPhone, Android, Internet, Games and many more digital platforms that received WSJU's host of stations regardless of viewers' locations. AiLive also allowed viewers to send text messages to friends, which were displayed on air.

WSJU-TV reached 80 percent of the 1,000,000 households directly over-the-air and 100% of the territory via the three major cable providers.

In April 2017, WSJU-TV announced that it would shut down in the next few months, after the Federal Communications Commission (FCC)'s incentive auction, without any channel sharing agreement. The station successfully sold its spectrum for $5,202,091.

Due to the passage of Hurricane Irma across Puerto Rico, WSJU-TV ceased broadcasting on September 5, 2017, ending nearly 34 years of operation. Its license was canceled by the FCC on June 26, 2018.

On June 27, 2019, WSJU-TV's intellectual unit was moved to WSJU-LP in Ceiba, which is now branded as Fresh 99.9 TV, for its music video programming, and W08EI-D, which broadcast TeleMaxx on channel 39.1 until November 1, 2020.

Digital channels
The station's digital signal was multiplexed:

References

External links
France24
Latin Music Television

Application to assign station license

SJU-TV
Mass media in San Juan, Puerto Rico
Television channels and stations established in 1966
1966 establishments in Puerto Rico
Television channels and stations disestablished in 2018
2018 disestablishments in Puerto Rico
Defunct television stations in the United States
SJU-TV